, also known by the nickname Nigoro, is a Japanese video game artist, designer and director.

Career
Minagawa had worked at Quest Corporation alongside his colleagues Yasumi Matsuno and Akihiko Yoshida before they all decided to switch to Square in 1995. He continued collaborating with his co-workers as the art director of Final Fantasy Tactics and Vagrant Story. For the Final Fantasy XII project, he was originally the graphics and real-time visual director. However, when the original director Matsuno left the company due to an illness, Minagawa was put in charge of directing the game in collaboration with Hiroyuki Ito. He felt that the pressure of working on a Final Fantasy installment helped him and influenced his decisions. Minagawa most enjoyed the period in which the team continued to come up with new ideas, but he ultimately had to decide to abandon many features in order to finish the game.

Following the positive reception of Final Fantasy Tactics: The War of the Lions, a decision was made to remake Quest's Tactics Ogre: Let Us Cling Together. Minagawa directed the game and took on the laborious task of assembling the original 1995 staff members—including Matsuno—who were now working at different companies. Upon finishing his work on the project, Minagawa was asked to join the Final Fantasy XIV team as the lead user interface and web designer. This was part of a plan to salvage the game after its initial negative reception by critics and players. Director Naoki Yoshida considered the fact that one of the Final Fantasy XII directors was now solely responsible for one aspect of Final Fantasy XIV an indication of how serious Square Enix was about improving the game. A new and improved version of the game called Final Fantasy XIV: A Realm Reborn was eventually released to critical acclaim.

Works

References

1970 births
Final Fantasy designers
Living people
Video game artists
Japanese video game directors
Square Enix people